Klas Hugo Sillén (18 December 1892, Stockholm – 4 December 1971) was a Swedish Communist politician. In the 1929 split of the Communist Party of Sweden, Sillén led the pro-Comintern fraction that expelled Karl Kilbom and the majority of the party members with support of the Comintern that feared Kilbom would support Bukharin's right opposition against Joseph Stalin. Hugo Sillén became a devoted Stalinist.

1892 births
1971 deaths
Politicians from Stockholm
Swedish communists